Brima Keita is a Sierra Leonean football manager; and he is currently the manager of Sierra Leone National Premier League club, Old Edwardians F.C.

External links
http://www.christiantrede.com/webdesign/clients/newcitizen/archive.php?subaction=showfull&id=1174054924&archive=1175378412&start_from=&ucat=9&

Living people
Year of birth missing (living people)
Sierra Leonean football managers
Place of birth missing (living people)